Břehov is a municipality and village in České Budějovice District in the South Bohemian Region of the Czech Republic. It has about 200 inhabitants. The village is well preserved and is protected by law as a village monument zone.

References

Villages in České Budějovice District